Huashan is a district of the city of Ma'anshan, Anhui Province, China. In September 2012, Jinjiazhuang District was dissolved and merged with Huashan District.

Administrative divisions
Huashan District has 9 subdistricts and 1 town.

References

Ma'anshan